Jared Scott Norris (born July 19, 1993) is an American football linebacker who is a free agent. He played football at Centennial High School in Bakersfield, California, where he was a three-year letterman and earned All-State honors during his senior year. Norris played college football at Utah and signed with the Carolina Panthers as an undrafted free agent in 2016.

Early years
Norris played linebacker at Centennial High School in Bakersfield, California, where he was a three-year starter and three-year letterman.

In his junior year, he was named Second-team All-Area, Second-team All-Southwest Yosemite League and Centennial High's co-Defensive Most Valuable Player. He also won the Hometown All-Stars Linebacker Award.

He earned Second-team MaxPreps Division I All-State accolades as a senior. He was named the All-Area Defensive Player of the Year by The Bakersfield Californian and the Southwest Yosemite League Defensive Player of the Year. He also won the Bakersfield Jockey Club's Outstanding Athlete Award. He won the Hometown All-Stars Linebacker Award for the second consecutive year. He missed a few games his senior year due to Valley fever.

He graduated from Centennial High School in 2011. He was teammates with future NFL player Cody Kessler at Centennial High. Norris was a team captain as well. He also earned one letter in baseball.

In the class of 2011, Norris was rated a three-star recruit by Rivals.com, Scout.com, ESPN.com and 247Sports.com. He was also rated the No. 30 inside linebacker in the country by Rivals.com, the No. 29 middle linebacker in the country by Scout.com, the No. 37 inside linebacker in the country by ESPN.com, and the No. 28 inside linebacker in the country by 247Sports.com. He was also rated both a three-star recruit and the No. 28 inside linebacker in the country on 247Sports.com's composite rating, which takes into account the ratings of all the other major recruiting services in the country.

Norris committed to play college football for Utah in May 2010. He also received offers from California and New Mexico State.

College career
Norris played for the Utah Utes of the University of Utah from 2012 to 2015. He was redshirted in 2011. He was a three-year starter and four-year letterman. He played in seven games in 2012, recording two total tackles and a fumble recovery. He played in ten games and started seven of them in 2013. Five of his starts were at mac linebacker and two were at rover linebacker. He totaled 2 sacks, two pass breakups, two forced fumbles and 64 total tackles, 4.5 of which were tackles for loss. He missed two games due to injury. He earned Honorable Mention Academic All-Pac-12 honors.

Norris played in 13 games in 2014. All of his starts were at rover linebacker. He recorded 116 total tackles, which was the most on the team and fourth most in the Pac-12. He also averaged 8.9 tackles per game, which was third most in the Pac-12. He was named the 2014 Las Vegas Bowl Defensive "Out-Performer" of the game. He also had 13 tackles for loss, 4 sacks and one pass breakup. He earned Honorable Mention All-Pac-12 and Honorable Mention Academic All-Pac-12 accolades.

He appeared in 12 games in 2015. All of his starts were at mac linebacker. He accumulated one sack, two forced fumbles, one fumble recovery, five pass breakups and 87 total tackles, 6.5 of which were tackles for loss. He missed one game due to injury. He was named Second-team All-Pac-12. In April 2015, he was named to the watchlist for the Lott IMPACT Trophy. Three months later, he was named to the watchlists for the Bednarik Award, the Bronko Nagurski Trophy and the Butkus Award. In October 2015, he was named a quarter-finalist for the Lott IMPACT Trophy. He was a team captain in 2015 as well. He also played in the 2016 Senior Bowl as part of the North team.

Throughout his college career, Norris played in 42 games and started 32 of them. He recorded 7 sacks, eight pass breakups, four forced fumbles, two fumble recoveries, and 269 total tackles, 24 of which were tackles for loss. He had at least 10 tackles in 11 games during his career. He graduated from Utah with a bachelor's degree in economics.

Professional career
Norris was rated the ninth best inside linebacker in the 2016 NFL Draft by NFLDraftScout.com. Lance Zierlein of NFL.com predicted that he would be selected in the sixth or seventh round. Zierlein said that "Norris looks the part of a backup WILL inside linebacker in a 3-4 who has the potential to become an average starter down the road".

Carolina Panthers
After going undrafted in the 2016 NFL Draft, Norris signed with the Carolina Panthers on May 2, 2016. He played in 14 games in 2016, recording three solo tackles and three tackle assists. On December 5, 2017, Norris was placed on injured reserve. He played in 11 games in 2017 and recorded four solo tackles.

On October 12, 2018, Norris was placed on injured reserve after suffering a toe injury in practice. On March 3, 2019, Norris signed a two-year contract extension, but was waived during on August 31, 2019.

Washington Football Team
On February 13, 2020, Norris signed with the Washington Football Team, then known as the Redskins. He was waived on September 5, 2020 and signed to the practice squad the next day. He was elevated to the active roster on September 19 and September 26 for the team's weeks 2 and 3 games against the Arizona Cardinals and Cleveland Browns, and reverted to the practice squad after each game. He was promoted to the active roster on October 2, 2020.

Norris re-signed with the team on March 23, 2021. He was released on August 31, 2021, and re-signed to the practice squad the following day. He was promoted to active roster on September 11, 2021 after placing Curtis Samuel on injured reserve. He was placed on injured reserve on October 15 with a shoulder injury.

Personal life
Norris once attended Camp Woodward, a professional skateboarding camp.

References

External links
 
 College stats

1993 births
Living people
Players of American football from Bakersfield, California
American football linebackers
Utah Utes football players
Carolina Panthers players
Washington Redskins players
Washington Football Team players